Trametes is a genus of poroid fungi in the family Polyporaceae. , Index Fungorum accepts 195 species of Trametes:


A B C D E F G H I J K L M N O P Q R S T U V  W X Y Z

A
Trametes aesculi (Fr.) Justo (2014)
Trametes africana Ryvarden (2004) – Africa
Trametes alaskana D.V.Baxter (1942)
Trametes alba Ryvarden (2015) – Brazil
Trametes albidorosea E.Bommer & M.Rousseau (1900)
Trametes albocarneogilvida (Romell) S.Lundell (1946)
Trametes allantospora Corner (1989)
Trametes amplopora Lloyd (1936) – Philippines
Trametes amygdalea Maire (1922)
Trametes apiaria (Pers.) Zmitr., Wasser & Ezhov (2012)
Trametes arcana Corner (1989)
Trametes argenteiceps Corner (1989)
Trametes atra Pat. (1906)
Trametes atriceps Corner (1989)
Trametes azurea (Fr.) G.Cunn. (1965) – New South Wales; Victoria

B
Trametes badiuscula Corner (1989)
Trametes baldratiana Trotter (1925)
Trametes barbulata Corner (1989)
Trametes benetosta Corner (1989)
Trametes benevestita Corner (1989)
Trametes betulina
Trametes biogilvoides Corner (1989)
Trametes bresadolae Ryvarden (1988)
Trametes brunnea Ryvarden (2013)
Trametes brunneisetulosa Corner (1992)
Trametes brunneoflava Lloyd (1923)
Trametes brunneola (Berk.) Imazeki (1959) – Philippines
Trametes butignotii Boud. ex Lloyd (1910)

C

Trametes castaneifumosa Corner (1989)
Trametes cincta Bose (1922)
Trametes cinereosulfurea Ferd. & Winge (1949)
Trametes cingulata Berk. (1854)
 Trametes cinnabarinus Karsten (1881)
Trametes citrina Bres. (1920)
Trametes coccinea (Fr.) Hai J.Li & S.H.He (2014)
Trametes cotonea (Pat. & Har.) Ryvarden (1972) – Africa
Trametes cristobalensis Corner (1989)
Trametes cubensis (Mont.) Sacc. (1891)
Trametes cupreorosea Lloyd (1920)
Trametes cystidiata I.Lindblad & Ryvarden (1999) – Costa Rica
Trametes cystidiolophora B.K.Cui & H.J.Li (2010) – China

D
Trametes dealbata Kalchbr. ex G. Cunn. (1965)
Trametes decorticans Corner (1989)
Trametes decussata Pat. (1906)
Trametes demoulinii G.Castillo (1994) – Papua New Guinea
Trametes discoidea (Dicks.) Rauschert (1990)

E
Trametes ectypa (Berk. & M.A.Curtis) Gilb. & Ryvarden (1987) – United States
Trametes effusa Speg. (1916)
Trametes elegans (Spreng.) Fr. (1838)
Trametes elevata Corner (1989)
Trametes ellipsospora Ryvarden (1987) – Venezuela
Trametes extensa (Berk.) Pat. (1900)

F
Trametes farcta Lloyd (1915)
Trametes farinolens Corner (1989)
Trametes favolipora (Pilát) Pilát (1939)
Trametes febris Corner (1989)
Trametes flammula Corner (1989)
Trametes flavida (Lév.) Zmitr., Wasser & Ezhov (2012)
Trametes flavidinigra Corner (1989)
Trametes frustrata Corner (1989)
Trametes fuligineicana Corner (1989)
Trametes fulvidochmia Corner (1989)

G

Trametes galzinii (Bres.) Pilát (1940)
Trametes gibbosa (Pers.) Fr. (1838) – Europe
Trametes gilvoides Lloyd (1916)
Trametes gilvoumbrina Bres. (1920)
Trametes glabrata (Lloyd) Ryvarden (1992)
Trametes glabrorigens (Lloyd) Zmitr., Wasser & Ezhov (2012)
Trametes globospora Ryvarden & Aime (2009)
Trametes granulifera Corner (1989)
Trametes griseolilacina Van der Byl (1922)
Trametes griseoporus Lázaro Ibiza (1917)
Trametes guatemalensis Lloyd (1920)

H

Trametes havannensis (Berk. & M.A.Curtis) Murrill (1907)
Trametes hirsuta (Wulfen) Lloyd (1924) – widespread
Trametes hirta (P.Beauv.) Zmitr., Wasser & Ezhov (2012)
Trametes hispidans Berk. ex G.Cunn. (1965)
Trametes hololeuca (Kalchbr.) G.Cunn. (1949)
Trametes hostmannii (Berk.) Zmitr., Wasser & Ezhov (2012)
Trametes hunteri (Lloyd) Ryvarden (1972) – Sierra Leone

I
Trametes imbricata Ryvarden (2013)
Trametes indica Virdi (1991)

J
Trametes jejuna Corner (1989)
Trametes junipericola Manjón, G.Moreno & Ryvarden (1984) – Spain

K
Trametes karii Bose (1922)
Trametes krekei Lloyd (1919)
Trametes kusanoana Imazeki (1943)
Trametes kusanoi (Murrill) Sacc. & Trotter (1912)

L
Trametes lacerata Lloyd (1916)
Trametes lactinea Berkeley (1843)
Trametes lamaoensis Murrill (1907)
Trametes leonina (Klotzsch) Imazeki (1952) – Africa; Philippines
Trametes leptaula Speg. (1918)
Trametes lilacea Bres. (1926)
Trametes linguiformis Corner (1989)
Trametes ljubarskyi Pilát (1937) – Europe
Trametes lunispora Quanten (1996)
Trametes luridochracea Corner (1989)

M
Trametes macropora Bres. (1912)
Trametes manilaensis (Lloyd) Teng (1963)
Trametes marianna (Pers.) Ryvarden (1973) – Philippines
Trametes maxima (Mont.) A.David & Rajchenb. (1985) – South America
Trametes membranacea (Sw.) Kreisel (1971) – Belize; Colombia; Cuba; Jamaica; Puerto Rico; Rio de Janeiro; So Paulo; Trinidad-Tobago
Trametes merisma Peck (1910)
Trametes meyenii (Klotzsch) Lloyd (1918) – Ghana; Papua New Guinea; Philippines; Samoa; Seychelles; Sierra Leone; Sudan
Trametes microporoides Corner (1989)
Trametes mimetes (Wakef.) Ryvarden (1972) – Malawi; Papua New Guinea
Trametes minima Berk. (1919)
Trametes minor Bres. (1920)
Trametes minutus Læssøe & Ryvarden (2010) – Ecuador
Trametes modesta (Kunze ex Fr.) Ryvarden (1972) – Bolivia; Philippines; Sierra Leone
Trametes morganii Lloyd (1919)
Trametes multiflabellata Corner (1989)

N
Trametes niam-niamensis (Henn.) Zmitr., Wasser & Ezhov (2012)
Trametes nigroaspera Lloyd (1924)
Trametes nigroplebeia Lloyd (1922)
Trametes nivosa (Berk.) Murrill (1907) – Bolivia; Rio de Janeiro

O

Trametes obscurata Bres. (1911)
Trametes obscurotexta Lloyd (1924)
Trametes obstinatior Corner (1989)
Trametes ochracea (Pers.) Gilb. & Ryvarden (1987) – Bolivia; France; Germany; Great Britain; Sri Lanka
Trametes ochroflava Cooke (1880) – Rio de Janeiro
Trametes olivaceopora Ryvarden & Iturr. (2003) – Venezuela
Trametes orientalis (Yasuda) Imazeki (1943)
Trametes ornata (Peck) Pilát (1940)

P

Trametes palisotii (Fr.) Imazeki (1952) – France; Ghana; Kenya; Mauritius; Nigeria; Philippines; Queensland; Sierra Leone; Togo; Trinidad-Tobago; Zambia
Trametes pallidilusor Corner (1989)
Trametes papuasia Corner (1989)
Trametes paxillosa Corner (1989)
Trametes pergamena Lloyd (1917)
Trametes perpallida Corner (1989)
Trametes philippinensis Lloyd (1924) – Philippines
Trametes pocas (Berk.) Ryvarden (1984) – Cameroon
Trametes polyblastes Corner (1989)
Trametes polyzona (Pers.) Justo (2011)
Trametes pribramensis Pilát (1927)
Trametes primulina Corner (1989)
Trametes propinqua (Speg.) Rick (1960)
Trametes psila (Lloyd) Ryvarden (2015)
Trametes pubescens (Schumach.) Pilát (1939) – Austria; Cameroon; Cyprus; Czech Republic; Great Britain; Hong Kong; Italy; Montserrat; New South Wales; New York
Trametes pusilla Lloyd (1918)

Q
Trametes quarrei (Beeli) Zmitr., Wasser & Ezhov (2012)
Trametes quercina Lloyd (1922)

R
Trametes raduloides (Pilát) Pilát (1940)
Trametes repanda (Pers.) Justo (2014)
Trametes rigidiceps Corner (1989)
Trametes robiniophila Murrill (1907)
Trametes roseola Pat. & Har. (1900) – Sabah; Sierra Leone
Trametes roseopora Lloyd (1922)
Trametes rugosituba Corner (1989)
Trametes rugosopicta Lloyd (1920)

S

Trametes salebrosa Van der Byl (1924) – South Africa
Trametes salina Corner (1989)
Trametes salmonea Imazeki (1952)
Trametes sediliensis Corner (1989)
Trametes similis Bres. (1912)
Trametes socotrana  Cooke (1882) – Cameroon; Mozambique
Trametes speciosa (Fr.) Zmitr., Wasser & Ezhov (2012)
Trametes stowardii Lloyd (1917)
Trametes strumosa (Fr.) Zmitr., Wasser & Ezhov (2012)
Trametes stuckertiana (Speg.) Speg. (1909)
Trametes styracicola Henn. (1902)
Trametes suaveolens  (L.) Fr. (1838) – Europe
Trametes subalutacea Bourdot & Galzin (1925) – Europe
Trametes subectypa (Murrill) Gilb. & Ryvarden (1987)
Trametes subincana Corner (1989)
Trametes sublutea Corner (1989)
Trametes subminima Lloyd (1920)
Trametes subocellata Lloyd (1924)
Trametes subserpens Murrill (1920)
Trametes substrata Corner (1989)
Trametes subsuaveolens B.K.Cui & Y.C.Dai (2007) – China
Trametes sultan-ahmadii Corner (1989)
Trametes supermodesta Ryvarden & Iturr. (2003) – Roraima
Trametes symploci Yasuda (1923)

T

Trametes tenacipora Corner (1989)
Trametes tenuirosea Lloyd (1923)
Trametes tenuis (Berk.) Justo (2014)
Trametes tephroleuca Berk. (1854)
Trametes textulaminata Corner (1989)
Trametes theae Zimm. (1901)
Trametes trogii Berk. (1850) – Europe
Trametes truncatispora Yasuda (1919)
Trametes tuberculata Bres. (1912)
Trametes turpis Corner (1989)
Trametes tyromycoides Ryvarden (2000)

U
Trametes unguliformis (Murrill) Ryvarden (1985)

V

Trametes varians Van der Byl (1922)
Trametes variegata (Berk.) Zmitr., Wasser & Ezhov (2012)
Trametes vernicipes (Berk.) Zmitr., Wasser & Ezhov (2012)
Trametes versicolor (L.) Lloyd (1921) – widespread
Trametes verticalis Corner (1989)
Trametes vespacea (Pers.) Zmitr., Wasser & Ezhov (2012)
Trametes villosa (Sw.) Kreisel (1971) – Cayman Is.; Colombia; Cuba; Dominican Republic; Guatemala; Jamaica; Mauritius; Puerto Rico; Rio de Janeiro; St.Lucia; Trinidad-Tobago
Trametes violacea Lloyd (1915)
Trametes vitrea Lloyd (1919)

W
Trametes williamsii Murrill (1907)

X
Trametes xanthopodoides Corner (1989)

References

Trametes species, List of